Hunger/La Faim is a 1973 animated short film produced by the National Film Board of Canada. It was directed by Peter Foldes and is one of the first computer animation films. The story, told without words, is a morality tale about greed and gluttony in contemporary society.

National Research Council
Peter Foldes worked in collaboration with the National Research Council's Division of Radio and Electrical Engineering's Data Systems Group, who decided to develop a computer animation application in 1969. NRC scientist Nestor Burtnyk had heard an animator from Disney explain the traditional animation process, where a head animator draws the key cels and assistants draw the fill in pictures. The work of the artist's assistant seemed to Burtnyk to be the ideal demonstration vehicle for computer animation and within a year he programmed a "key frame animation" package to create animated sequences from key frames. The NFB in Montreal was contacted so that artists could experiment with computer animation. Foldes made a 1971 experimental film involving freehand drawings called Metadata. This was followed by Hunger, which took him and his NRC partners a year and a half to make. It cost $38,893 to create.

Awards
 Cannes Film Festival, Cannes: Special Jury Award - Short Films, 1974
 Edinburgh International Film Festival, Edinburgh: Certificate of Merit, Interfilm Jury, 1974
 Chicago International Film Festival, Chicago: Silver Hugo, 1974 
 Chicago International Film Festival, Chicago: Norman McLaren Award, 1974 
 International Week of Cinema in Colour, Barcelona: Gold Medal, 1974
 International Week of Cinema, Nairobi: Gold Impala for Best Short Film, 1974
 Yorkton Film Festival, Yorkton: Golden Sheaf Award for Best Animation, 1975
 International Animation Film Festival, New York: Golden Praxinoscope, 1975
 World Festival of Animated Film, Varna, Bulgaria: Special Award, Short and Medium Length Films, 1975
 Melbourne Film Festival, Melbourne: Diploma of Merit, 1975
 American Film and Video Festival, New York: Blue Ribbon, International Affairs, 1975
 Philadelphia International Festival of Short Films, Philadelphia: Award for Exceptional Merit, 1975
 28th British Academy Film Awards, London: BAFTA Award for Best Short Animation, 1975
 47th Academy Awards, Los Angeles: Nominee: Best Animated Short Film, 1975

References

Works cited

External links
Watch Hunger at NFB.ca

1973 films
1970s computer-animated films
National Film Board of Canada animated short films
Computer-animated short films
Quebec films
BAFTA winners (films)
Animated films without speech
Hunger
National Research Council (Canada)
1970s animated short films
1973 animated films
Films directed by Peter Foldes
Films scored by Pierre F. Brault
1970s Canadian films